The 1933–34 Gauliga was the inaugural season of the Gauliga, the first tier of the football league system in Germany from 1933 to 1945. 

The Gauligas replaced the seven regional championships and the numerous local leagues which previously existed in Germany. The Gauligas were established after the rise of the Nazis to power in 1933. In the season previous to the establishment German football had been sub-divided into almost 70 local tier-one leagues with an average number of 10 clubs per league, resulting in close to 700 top level clubs. These leagues had, up till 1933, played out seven regional championships with the top clubs of those advancing to the national German championship.

The league operated in sixteen regional divisions, of which two, the Gauliga Ostpreußen and Gauliga Pommern, were sub-divided into two regional groups again, with the league containing 178 clubs all up. The  league champions entered the 1934 German football championship, won by FC Schalke 04 who defeated 1. FC Nürnberg 2–1 in the final. It was Schalke's first-ever national championship and the club would go on to win five more during the Gauliga era of German football from 1933 to 1945.

Viktoria Stolp, champions of the Gauliga Pommern, was the only club to remain unbeaten during the league season, winning all twelve games in the eastern division of the league and going on to win and draw in the two finals against western champions Stettiner SC. At the other end of the table three clubs finished the season with just one win, Viktoria Stralsund, Phönix Köslin and Schweriner FC. Hamburger SV scored the most goals of any Gauliga club with 91 while Schweriner FC conceded the most with 119. 1. FC Nürnberg and Dresdner SC achieved the highest points totals with 34 each while Viktoria Stralsund earned the least with two points to its name.

Champions
The 1933–34 Gauliga champions qualified for the group stage of the German championship. SV Waldhof Mannheim, Viktoria 89 Berlin, 1. FC Nuremberg and FC Schalke 04 won their championship groups and advanced to the semi-finals with the latter two reaching the championship final which Schalke won.

German championship

References

Sources
 kicker-Almanach 1990  Yearbook of German football, publisher: kicker Sportmagazin, published: 1989, 
 100 Jahre Süddeutscher Fußball-Verband  100 Years of the Southern German Football Federation, publisher: SFV, published: 1997
 Die deutschen Gauligen 1933–45 – Heft 1–3  Tables of the Gauligas 1933–45, publisher: DSFS
 Fußball-Jahrbuch Deutschland 1930/31 – 1932/33  Tables of the top-level league's in Germany 1930–33, publisher: DSFS

External links
 Das Deutsche Fussball Archiv  Historic German league tables

1933-34
1
Ger